Inspector is a 1970 Bollywood action thriller about an Indian terrorist who attempts to release a poisonous gas into the atmosphere. Directed by Chand, the film stars Joy Mukherjee, Alka & Helen

Cast
Joy Mukherjee ... Inspector Rajesh / Agent 707
Alka ... Rita
Jayant ... Marshal
M. B. Shetty ... Pinto
Helen ... Hotel Flamenco Dancer

Soundtrack

References

External links
 

1970 films
Films about terrorism in India
1970s Hindi-language films
1970s action films
Films scored by Datta Naik